This is a season-by-season list of records compiled by St. Lawrence in men's ice hockey.

St. Lawrence University has made twenty-two appearances in the NCAA Tournament, making the Frozen Four seven times and the championship game two times.

Clarkson completed an undefeated season in 1956, however, because eight members of the team were 4-year seniors and would have been ineligible to play in the tournament Clarkson declined the invitation.

Season-by-season results

Note: GP = Games played, W = Wins, L = Losses, T = Ties

* Winning percentage is used when conference schedules are unbalanced.† St. Lawrence played jointly in ECAC Hockey and the Tri-State League/ICAC from 1961 to 1972.‡ Leon Abbott resigned in December of 1979 after losing eight consecutive games.

Footnotes

References

 
Lists of college men's ice hockey seasons in the United States
St. Lawrence Saints ice hockey seasons